James Gilmour may refer to:

Jim Gilmour (boxer), British Olympic boxer
James Gilmour (Miramichi lumber baron) (1782–1858), entrepreneur
James Gilmour (missionary) (1843–1891), Scottish Protestant Christian missionary in China and Mongolia
James Gilmour (politician) (1842–1908), politician in Ontario Canada
Jim Gilmour (1881–1918), rugby league footballer of the 1910s for New Zealand and Wellington
Jim Gilmour (RNZN officer), Commander Joint Forces New Zealand
Jimmy Gilmour (born 1961), Scottish footballer

See also
James Gilmore (disambiguation)